Richard Tonry may refer to:
 Richard A. Tonry (1935–2012), U.S. Representative from Louisiana
 Richard J. Tonry (1893–1971), U.S. Representative from New York